The Clerk of Tynwald is the chief administrator of the Court of Tynwald in the Isle of Man. He also serves as secretary to the House of Keys and counsel to the Speaker. He assists the president in managing the business of the House of Keys, keeps records of proceedings, and advises members on bills. He provides legal and parliamentary advice to all members and is therefore always a qualified lawyer.

The current Clerk of Tynwald is Roger Phillips LLB, who was previously a Deputy Principal Clerk in the House of Commons and before that practised at the English Bar.

List of Clerks of Tynwald
Professor St. John Bates, 1987 - 2001
Malachy Cornwell-Kelly LLB AKC MCMI, 2001 - 2008
Roger Phillips LLB 2008–present

References

Tynwald
Manx law
Tynwald